Possum Trot is a small unincorporated community in southeastern Shelby County, Texas, United States, near the city of Huxley and the Louisiana border. Originally settled by small farmers in the late 19th century, Possum Trot's current residents are "mostly working-class African-Americans".

References

Unincorporated communities in Texas
Unincorporated communities in Shelby County, Texas
African Americans in Texas
African-American history of Texas